Gordon Kahn (1902–1962) was an American writer and screenwriter who was blacklisted during the McCarthy era; he is the father of broadcaster and author Tony Kahn.

Background
Gordon Jacques Kahn was born on May 11, 1901 in Szigetvár, Hungary.  When he was six years old, he and his parents moved to the Lower East Side of Manhattan in the United States of America.  In 1918, Kahn graduated from Townsend Harris High School in New York City.  He spent the next year at Yale University, then took up studies at Columbia University

Career
While studying at Yale, Kahn became a reporter for the Bridgeport Star.

New York
In New York, he worked for the New York Herald and Zitt's Theatrical Weekly, the latter for which he wrote a Broadway column in the style of Samuel Pepys.  In 1922, he wrote a book called Manhattan Oases about speakeasies, illustrated by his roommate of the time, Al Hirschfeld.  For much of the 1920s, Kahn wrote for the New York Daily Mirror.

Hollywood
In 1930, former Mirror colleague Samuel Marx (later head of scenery at MGM), invited Kahn to move to Hollywood and try his luck as a screenwriter.  He wrote more than a script a year (well over two dozen) in a period under two decades.  Writing credits include: The Death Kiss (1932), Newsboys' Home (1938), and Buy Me That Town (1941).

Kahn joined several leftist and liberal causes and helped found the Screen Writers Guild (now Writers Guild of America).  He was the first managing editor of The Screen Writer.

Hollywood blacklist
In 1947, when the House Un-American Activities Committee (HUAC) began its hearings on "Communist infiltration," Kahn was one of the "Nineteen Unfriendlies" subpoenaed.  He was not called to testify and so did not become one of the Hollywood Ten.  Soon after December 1947, however, when the Studios announced the firing of the Hollywood Ten, Kahn lost his job at Warner Bros. Studios.  In 1948, he published Hollywood on Trial.

Kahn sold his 13-room Beverly Hills home, and he and his family moved into a smaller house in Studio City.  In 1950, fearing arrest, he fled to Cuernavaca, Mexico.  His wife and sons Jim and Tony joined him six months later.  The Kahns lived there until low funds in 1956, after which they returned to the United States and lived in Manchester, New Hampshire.

Kahn used the pseudonym "Hugh G. Foster" to write magazine articles for Holiday and Atlantic Monthly, but he never wrote scripts for Hollywood again.

Personal life and death
Kahn married Barbara Brodie; they had two sons.

Kahn is described as a "man who affected a beard and monocle."  One FBI report noted that Kahn had "a facial resemblance to Lenin."

Gordon Kahn died age 61 on December 31, 1962, of a heart attack during a snowstorm in Manchester.

Works

Film Screenplays:
 1931:  X Marks the Spot
 1932:  The Death Kiss
 1934: The Crosby Case, Mama Runs Wild, The People's Enemy
 1935:  Gigolette
 1937:  Navy Blues (1937 film), The Sheik Steps Out
 1938:  I Stand Accused, Newsboys' Home, Tenth Avenue Kid
 1939: Ex-Champ, Mickey the Kid, S.O.S. Tidal Wave, Ex-Champ
 1940:  Wolf of New York
 1941: Buy Me That Town, World Premiere
 1942:  Northwest Rangers, A Yank on the Burma Road
 1944:  Cowboy and the Senorita, 'Lights of Old Santa Fe, Song of Nevada 1945:  Two O'Clock Courage 1946: Blonde Alibi, Her Kind of Man 1948:  Whiplash (1948 film), Ruthless (film) 1949: Streets of San Francisco (film)Television:
 1956:  The Adventures of Robin Hood - screenplay for 1 episode as "Norman Best"

Books:
 Manhattan Oases illustrated by Al Hirschfeld (1922) (2003)
 Recent American History (1933)
 Hollywood on Trial (1948)

Legacy
Kahn is the subject of his son Tony's 1987 short documentary The Day the Cold War Came Home.Blacklisted,'' a docu-drama in six half-hour episodes that first aired on National Public Radio in 1997, chronicles the last fifteen years of Gordon Kahn's life and the fears and ordeal his family experienced. It was written, produced, and narrated by Gordon Kahn's son Tony Kahn. All of the words of Gordon and his wife Barbara were drawn from their writings, diaries, and letters. The words put in the mouth of J. Edgar Hoover were all derived from a confidential 3,000-page FBI surveillance file on Gordon Kahn dated from 1944 to 1962.

See also

 Tony Kahn
 Hollywood blacklist

References

External links
 Wisconsin Historical Society:  Gordon Kahn Papers, 1944-1950
 

1902 births
1962 deaths
American male screenwriters
Hollywood blacklist
People from New York City
People from Cuernavaca
Jewish American novelists
American communists
Columbia University alumni
Yale University alumni
20th-century American male writers
20th-century American writers
20th-century American screenwriters